Cooraclare GAA  is a Gaelic Athletic Association club located in the village of Cooraclare, County Clare in Ireland. The club field teams exclusively in Gaelic Football competitions.

Major honours
 Munster Senior Club Football Championship Runners-Up: 1964
 Clare Senior Football Championship (10): 1915, 1917, 1918, 1944 (with Kilmihil), 1945, 1956, 1964, 1965, 1986, 1997
 Clare Football League Div. 1 (Cusack Cup) (13): 1945, 1953, 1955, 1956, 1958, 1964, 1966, 1985, 1987, 1988, 1992, 2004, 2009
 Clare Intermediate Football Championship (5): 1927, 1941, 1943, 1954, 1957 (as Cree)
 Clare Junior A Football Championship (3): 1965, 1988, 1998
 Clare Under-21 A Football Championship (5): 1972, 1986, 1988, 1991, 2017

References

External links
Official Site
Club Lotto
GAA Info Profile

Gaelic games clubs in County Clare
Hurling clubs in County Clare